The  (English: 1st Submarine Squadron) is a submarine squadron of the German Navy. It is based at Eckernförde, Schleswig-Holstein, and forms part of Einsatzflottille 1, headquartered in Kiel.

History
The 1st Ubootgeschwader (1st UG) was set up on 1 October 1961 in Kiel. The 1st UG received its first submarine, the newly-commissioned Type 201 submarine U-1, on 21 March 1962. The U-1 was the first submarine constructed in post-war Germany. U-1s sister ship, U-2 followed in May 1962. The former R boat Merkur was assigned to the squadron as a support ship. The Type 201 submarines were eventually found to be unsatisfactory and were decommissioned early. The successor class, the Type 205 submarine, entered service in the following years, with eleven boats joining the squadron between 1962 and 1969. In 1964, the two submarine tenders Lahn and Lech entered service with the 1st UG. Merkur left service the same year.

Since October 2016 the German submarine arm consists of six Type 212 submarines. However because of damage and missing spare parts, none of the six boats were in active service as of October 2017.

Composition
 Six Type 212 submarines
U-31
U-32
U-33
U-34
U-35
U-36
Three Oste-class fleet service ships
Oste
Oker
Alster
One Elbe-class replenishment ship
Main

References

Military units and formations of the German Navy
Submarine squadrons